Michael Cohen (born October 5, 1986), known by his stage name Cohen or by his producer name Cohen Beats (stylized as CohenBeats or Cohenbeats), he is a half of the duo Cohen@Mushon beside Michael Moshonov.

Biography 
Born in Israel, the son of film director Avi Cohen and actress Meirav Gary, and the grandson of Pnina Gary, Michael Cohen began his musical career in collaboration with Michael Moshonov; the two founded the musical duo Cohen@Mushon, and after they produced music videos for their songs they signed to the record label Hed Arzi. In 2008 Hed Artzi released "Kosher Gufani", the debut album of Cohen@Mushon. After 3 years they released their second album "Machshev Lekol Yeled", which got many praises. at the same time Cohen produced multiple albums and singles to other artists, for example the album "Mamshichim Liv'ot" by the duo Peled & Ortega.

After the release of the second album Cohen flew to United States, first living in New York and then in Los Angeles, there he performed under the name Cohen Beats (stylized as CohenBeats) mainly as record producer and DJ.

Discography

Studio albums

Mixtapes

Mini-albums

References 

1986 births
Living people
Jewish rappers
Israeli rappers
21st-century Israeli male musicians
Israeli hip hop record producers
Israeli hip hop musicians
Israeli artists
Musicians from Tel Aviv
Jewish Israeli musicians
Israeli people of Romanian-Jewish descent
Israeli people of American-Jewish descent
Israeli people of Ukrainian-Jewish descent